It Goes Without Saying is the only studio album by the British band the Dum Dums, released in the United Kingdom on 18 September 2000.

Reception

Track listing
 "The Kind Of Day I've Had"
 "Everything"
 "Caught Me in a Trap"
 "Until My Ship Comes In"
 "Can't Get You Out of My Thoughts"
 "You Knock Me Off My Feet"
 "Killing Me with Kindess"
 "Lonely Hearts Company"
 "You Do Something to Me"
 "Hole in Your Heart"
 "Army of Two"
 Contains the hidden track "Setting Sail".

Notes

2000 debut albums
Dum Dums (band) albums